Sara Mesa (born 1976) is a Spanish writer. Born in Madrid, she has lived in Seville since childhood. As a poet, she won the Premio Nacional de Poesía Miguel Hernández in 2007 for Este jilguero agenda. Since then, she has published the novels Un incendio invisible (Premio Málaga de Novela) and El trepanador de cerebros, and the short story collections No es fácil ser verde and La sobriedad del galápago. Her novel Cuatro por cuatro was nominated for the Premio Herralde.

Bibliography 
Novels

El trepanador de cerebros (2010). The Trepanner.
Un incendio invisible (2011; re-edited 2017). An Invisible Fire.
Cuatro por cuatro (2012). Four by Four, trans. Katie Whittemore (Open Letter, 2020).
Cicatriz (2015). Scar, trans. Adriana Nodal-Tarafa (Dalkey Archive, 2017).
Cara de pan (2018). Among the Hedges, trans. Megan McDowell (Open Letter, 2021).
Un amor (2020). A Love.

Short story collections

La sobriedad del galápago (2008). The Sobriety of the Terrapin.
No es fácil ser verde (2009). It's Not Easy to Be Green.
Mala letra (2016). Bad Handwriting, trans. Katie Whittemore (Open Letter, 2022).

Poems

 Este jilguero agenda (2007). This Goldfinch Agenda.

Essays

 Silencio administrativo (2019). Administrative Silence.
Perder el miedo. Un manual para la vida (2020).

Awards and honors 

 2007 - Premio Nacional de Poesía Miguel Hernández, for Este jilguero agenda
 2011 - Premio Málaga de Novela, for Un incendio invisible
 2016 - Premio Ojo Crítico de Narrativa, for Cicatriz
2017 - Premio Literario Arzobispo Juan de San Clemente, for Cicatriz
2021 - Premios de los libreros (ficción), for Un amor

References

External links

Spanish women poets
1976 births
Living people
Spanish women novelists
21st-century Spanish poets
21st-century Spanish novelists
21st-century short story writers
21st-century Spanish women writers
Spanish women short story writers
Spanish short story writers
Writers from Madrid